Petersburg is an unincorporated community located within Upper Township in Cape May County, New Jersey, United States.

A post office was established in 1856, with Peter Corson as the first postmaster.

Education
Upper Township School District operates public schools for K-8. Upper Township Primary School and Upper Township Elementary School have Marmora addresses while Upper Township Middle School has a Petersburg address. Ocean City High School of Ocean City School District has high school students from Upper Township.

Countywide schools include Cape May County Technical High School and Cape May County Special Services School District.

Cape May County Library operates the Upper Township Branch in Petersburg.

Notable people

People who were born in, residents of, or otherwise closely associated with Petersburg include:
 Dummy Stephenson (1869-1924), outfielder in Major League Baseball who played for the Philadelphia Phillies in 1892.
 Adam Williamson (born 1984), professional soccer midfielder who has played for the Ocean City Barons in the USL Premier Development League.

References

Upper Township, New Jersey
Unincorporated communities in Cape May County, New Jersey
Unincorporated communities in New Jersey